Joseph Henshaw (1608–1679) was bishop of Peterborough in the East of England from 1663 until his death. Henshaw was educated at London Charterhouse and Magdalen Hall of Hertford College, Oxford, receiving a B.A. in 1624 and a D.D. in 1639. He subsequently was chaplain to the Earl of Bristol and Duke of Buckingham; held benefices in Sussex; was delinquent in debts for which he had to compound for his estate in 1646. In 1660, he was precentor and dean of Chichester and dean of Windsor. From that office he ascended to bishop of Peterborough.

His Horæ Succisivæ (1631) was edited by William Barclay Turnbull for republication in 1839, and Meditations miscellaenous, holy and humane (1637); they were reprinted at Oxford in 1841. Horæ Succisivæ was also translated into Danish by the vicar at Voss in western Norway in the 17th century when British theological works were being distributed among Norwegian clergy.

See also
List of bishops of Peterborough
List of Old Carthusians

References

External links

1608 births
1679 deaths
People from Peterborough
Bishops of Peterborough
Deans of Chichester
17th-century Church of England bishops